Urszula Bhebhe (born 1 January 1992) is a Polish hurdler. She competed in the 60 metres hurdles event at the 2014 IAAF World Indoor Championships.

Her athletic career began with sprinting, but she later specialized in racing. After winning multiple medals in national championships in junior categories, in 2011, she unexpectedly became national champion setting a personal record result of 8.43 in the course of the 60 meter hurdles. In 2012, she won the gold in the Polish national championship establishing a personal record in the 100 meter hurdles - 13.34.

References

External links
 

1992 births
Living people
Polish female hurdlers
Place of birth missing (living people)
European Games competitors for Poland
Athletes (track and field) at the 2019 European Games
21st-century Polish women